Djibouti competed at the 2020 Summer Olympics in Tokyo. Originally scheduled to take place from 24 July to 9 August 2020, the Games were postponed to 23 July to 8 August 2021, because of the COVID-19 pandemic. This was the nation's ninth appearance at the Summer Olympics.  Djibouti did not field any athletes at the 2004 Summer Olympics in Athens.

Competitors
The following is the list of number of competitors in the Games.

Athletics

Djibouti athletes further achieved the entry standards, either by qualifying time or by world ranking, in the following track and field events (up to a maximum of 3 athletes in each event):

Track & road events

Judo
 
Djibouti qualified one judoka for the men's lightweight category (73 kg) at the Games. Aden-Alexandre Houssein accepted a continental berth from Africa as the nation's top-ranked judoka outside of direct qualifying position in the IJF World Ranking List of June 28, 2021.

Swimming

Djibouti received a universality invitation from FINA to send a top-ranked male swimmer in his respective individual events to the Olympics, based on the FINA Points System of June 28, 2021.

References

External links 

Nations at the 2020 Summer Olympics
2020
2021 in Djiboutian sport